Gambhu is a village in Bahucharaji Taluka of Mehsana district in Gujarat, India.

History
The ruins of Karnasagar lake built by Chaulukya ruler Karna are located near the village. The village was known as Gambhuyata in history. Jain monk Shilgunsuri had lived here and it is believed that Chavda king Vanaraja lived here during his incognito years.

According to the Nemināha-cariu by Haribhadrasuri, after the coronation of Vanaraja, he asked an elderly Jain merchant-prince of the Pragavata lineage from Gambhuya (Gambhu) village (although originally from Shrimal/Bhinmal) named Ṭhakkura Ninnaya to live in Anahilapataka (Patan) as a minister in Vanaraja's court, and Ninnaya's son Lahara became a general (daṇḍapati).

Places of interest 

The village is a pilgrim centre of Jainism. There is a Jain temple of Gambhira Parshwanath in the village. In 2022, eleven Jain statues from 11th-12th century were found during the excavation.

Amenities 
The village has three primary and a secondary schools. It has a primary health centre and a post office.

References

Villages in Mehsana district